Phoma costaricensis is a plant pathogen infecting coffee. It is a soil fungus that infects the leaves and fruits of the coffee plant prior to the fruit ripening.

References

External links 
 Index Fungorum
 USDA ARS Fungal Database

Fungal plant pathogens and diseases
Coffee diseases
costaricensis
Fungi described in 1957